2012 Thai Premier League (known as Sponsor Thai Premier League for sponsorship reasons) is the 16th season of the Thai Premier League since its establishment in 1996. A total of 18 teams are competing in the league.

Teams
Khonkaen, Siam Navy and Sriracha were relegated to the 2012 Thai Division 1 League after finishing the 2011 season in the bottom three places.

2011 Thai Division 1 League champions Buriram, runners-up Chainat and third place BBCU were promoted to the Thai Premier League. Buriram were to merge with Buriram PEA at the end of the 2011 campaign to become Buriram United allowing Wuachon United to take their place in the top flight for the first time.

Stadia and locations

Name changes

Thai Port were renamed to Port FC for the start of the season and then renamed back to Thai Port one week later.
Buriram PEA and Buriram merged to become Buriram United
Sisaket were renamed to Esan United for the start of the season.
TTM Phichit were renamed to TTM Chiangmai for the start of the season.
Buriram were renamed to Wuachon United for the start of the season.

Stadium Changes

Muangthong United's stadium would be known as SCG Stadium due to sponsorship reasons. The stadium was previously known as the Yamaha Stadium, again because of sponsorship reasons. The stadium was originally known as the Thunderdome Stadium.
BBCU moved in the Rajamangala Stadium, vacating the Thai Army Sports Stadium that was shared with Army United. However BBCU did use Muangthong United's SCG Stadium for the match with Chiangrai United due to the Rajamangala Stadium being unavailable
TTM Chiangmai moved from the Phichit Stadium to the 700th Anniversary Stadium .
Esan United moved into the Tung Burapha Stadium after relocating into Ubon Ratchathani province.
Wuachon United moved from the I-Mobile Stadium to the Tinasulanon Stadium .
Police United used the IPE Stadium in Chonburi until the Thammasat Stadium was ready following floods that also made them use alternative stadiums in the 2011 campaign. A few games were also stage at the Army Stadium in Bangkok.
BEC Tero Sasana hosted Osotspa at the Rajamangala Stadium due to the Thephasadin Stadium being unavailable.

Thai Premier League All-Star Exhibition game

Personnel and sponsoring

Managerial changes

Foreign players

League table

Results

Season statistics

Top scorers

Hat-tricks

 4 Player scored 4 goals

Attendance

Awards

Annual awards

Player of the Year
The Player of the Year was awarded to Teerasil Dangda.

Youth Player of the Year
The Youth Player of the Year was awarded to Chanathip Songkrasin.

Coach of the Year
The Coach of the Year was awarded to Slaviša Jokanović.

See also
 2012 Thai Division 1 League
 2012 Regional League Division 2
 2012 Thai FA Cup
 2012 Kor Royal Cup

References

2011
1